In point-set topology, an indecomposable continuum is a continuum that is indecomposable, i.e. that cannot be expressed as the union of any two of its proper subcontinua. In 1910, L. E. J. Brouwer was the first to describe an indecomposable continuum. 

Indecomposable continua have been used by topologists as a source of counterexamples. They also occur in dynamical systems.

Definitions

A continuum  is a nonempty compact connected metric space. The arc, the n-sphere, and the Hilbert cube are examples of path-connected continua; the topologist's sine curve and Warsaw circle are examples of non-path-connected continua. A space is nondegenerate if it is not equal to a single point. A continuum that is not decomposable is an indecomposable continuum. A continuum  in which every subcontinuum is indecomposable is said to be hereditarily indecomposable. An indecomposable continuum is irreducible between any two of its points.

History
Zygmunt Janiszewski described more such indecomposable continua, including a version of the bucket handle. Janiszewski, however, focused on the irreducibility of these continua. In 1917 Kunizo Yoneyama described the Lakes of Wada (named after Takeo Wada) whose common boundary is indecomposable. In the 1920s indecomposable continua began to be studied by the Warsaw School of Mathematics in Fundamenta Mathematicae for their own sake, rather than as pathological counterexamples. Stefan Mazurkiewicz was the first to give the definition of indecomposability. In 1922 Bronisław Knaster described the pseudo-arc, the first example found of a hereditarily indecomposable continuum.

Bucket handle example
Indecomposable continua are often constructed as the limit of a sequence of nested intersections, or (more generally) as the inverse limit of a sequence of continua. The buckethandle, or Brouwer–Janiszewski–Knaster continuum, is often considered the simplest example of an indecomposable continuum, and can be so constructed (see upper right). Alternatively, take the Cantor ternary set  projected onto the interval  of the -axis in the plane. Then the union of all such  is the bucket handle. 

The bucket handle admits no Borel transversal, that is there is no Borel set containing exactly one point from each composant.

Properties

In a sense, 'most' continua are indecomposable.

In dynamical systems

In 1932 George Birkhoff described his "remarkable closed curve", a homeomorphism of the annulus that contained an invariant continuum. Marie Charpentier showed that this continuum was indecomposable, the first link from indecomposable continua to dynamical systems. The invariant set of a certain Smale horseshoe map is the bucket handle. Marcy Barge and others have extensively studied indecomposable continua in dynamical systems.

See also 
Indecomposability (constructive mathematics)
Lakes of Wada, three open subsets of the plane whose boundary is an indecomposable continuum
Solenoid
Sierpinski carpet

References

External links

 
 explains Brouwer's picture of his indecomposable continuum that appears on the front cover of the journal.

Continuum theory